Yoga is a group of physical, mental, and spiritual practices or disciplines which originated in ancient India and aim to control (yoke) and still the mind, recognizing a detached witness-consciousness untouched by the mind (Chitta) and mundane suffering (Duḥkha). There is a wide variety of schools of yoga, practices, and goals in Hinduism, Buddhism, and Jainism, and traditional and modern yoga is practiced worldwide.

Two general theories exist on the origins of yoga. The linear model holds that yoga originated in the Vedic period, as reflected in the Vedic textual corpus, and influenced Buddhism; according to author Edward Fitzpatrick Crangle, this model is mainly supported by Hindu scholars. According to the synthesis model, yoga is a synthesis of non-Vedic and Vedic elements; this model is favoured in Western scholarship.

Yoga-like practices are first mentioned in the Rigveda. Yoga is referred to in a number of the Upanishads. The first known appearance of the word "yoga" with the same meaning as the modern term is in the Katha Upanishad, which was probably composed between the fifth and third centuries BCE. Yoga continued to develop as a systematic study and practice during the fifth and sixth centuries BCE in ancient India's ascetic and Śramaṇa movements. The most comprehensive text on Yoga, the Yoga Sutras of Patanjali, date to the early centuries of the Common Era; Yoga philosophy became known as one of the six orthodox philosophical schools (Darśanas) of Hinduism in the second half of the first millennium CE. Hatha yoga texts began to emerge between the ninth and 11th centuries, originating in tantra.

The term "yoga" in the Western world often denotes a modern form of Hatha yoga and a posture-based physical fitness, stress-relief and relaxation technique, consisting largely of asanas; this differs from traditional yoga, which focuses on meditation and release from worldly attachments. It was introduced by gurus from India after the success of Swami Vivekananda's adaptation of yoga without asanas in the late 19th and early 20th centuries. Vivekananda introduced the Yoga Sutras to the West, and they became prominent after the 20th-century success of hatha yoga.

Etymology

The Sanskrit noun योग  is derived from the root  (युज्)  "to attach, join, harness, yoke". Yoga is a cognate of the English word "yoke". According to Mikel Burley, the first use of the root of the word "yoga" is in hymn 5.81.1 of the Rigveda, a dedication to the rising Sun-god, where it has been interpreted as "yoke" or "control".

Pāṇini (4th c. BCE) wrote that the term yoga can be derived from either of two roots: yujir yoga (to yoke) or yuj samādhau ("to concentrate"). In the context of the Yoga Sutras, the root yuj samādhau (to concentrate) is considered the correct etymology by traditional commentators.

In accordance with Pāṇini, Vyasa (who wrote the first commentary on the Yoga Sutras) says that yoga means samadhi (concentration). In the Yoga Sutras (2.1), kriyāyoga is yoga's "practical" aspect: the "union with the supreme" in the performance of everyday duties. A person who practices yoga, or follows the yoga philosophy with a high level of commitment, is called a yogi; a female yogi may also be known as a yogini.

Definitions in classical texts 

The term yoga has been defined in different ways in Indian philosophical and religious traditions.

{| class="wikitable"
|+
!Source Text
!Approx. Date
!Definition of Yoga
|-
|Vaisesika sutra
| c. 4th century BCE
|"Pleasure and suffering arise as a result of the drawing together of the sense organs, the mind and objects. When that does not happen because the mind is in the self, there is no pleasure or suffering for one who is embodied. That is yoga" (5.2.15-16)
|-
|Katha Upanishad
| last centuries BCE
|"When the five senses, along with the mind, remain still and the intellect is not active, that is known as the highest state. They consider yoga to be firm restraint of the senses. Then one becomes un-distracted for yoga is the arising and the passing away" (6.10-11)
|-
|Bhagavad Gita
| c. 2nd century BCE
|"Be equal minded in both success and failure. Such equanimity is called Yoga" (2.48) 
"Yoga is skill in action" (2.50) 
"Know that which is called yoga to be separation from contact with suffering" (6.23)
|-
|Yoga Sutras of Patanjali
|c. first centuries CE
|1.2. yogas chitta vritti nirodhah - "Yoga is the calming down the fluctuations/patterns of mind"1.3. Then the Seer is established in his own essential and fundamental nature.1.4. In other states there is assimilation (of the Seer) with the modifications (of the mind).
|-
|Yogācārabhūmi-Śāstra (Sravakabhumi), a Mahayana Buddhist Yogacara work
| 4th century CE
|"Yoga is fourfold: faith, aspiration, perseverance and means" (2.152)
|-
|Kaundinya's Pancarthabhasya on the Pashupata-sutra
| 4th century CE
|"In this system, yoga is the union of the self and the Lord" (I.I.43)
|-
|Yogaśataka a Jain work by Haribhadra Suri
| 6th century CE
|"With conviction, the lords of Yogins have in our doctrine defined yoga as the concurrence (sambandhah) of the three [correct knowledge (sajjñana), correct doctrine (saddarsana) and correct conduct (saccaritra)] beginning with correct knowledge, since [thereby arises] conjunction with liberation....In common usage this [term] yoga also [denotes the Self's] contact with the causes of these [three], due to the common usage of the cause for the effect." (2, 4).
|-
|Linga Purana
| 
|"By the word 'yoga' is meant nirvana, the condition of Shiva." (I.8.5a)
|-
|Brahmasutra-bhasya of Adi Shankara 
| c. 8th century CE
|"It is said in the treatises on yoga: 'Yoga is the means of perceiving reality' (atha tattvadarsanabhyupāyo yogah)" (2.1.3)<ref>'Brahmasutra-bhasya, 2.1.3</ref>
|-
|Mālinīvijayottara Tantra, one of the primary authorities in non-dual Kashmir Shaivism
| 6th-10th century CE
|"Yoga is said to be the oneness of one entity with another." (4.4–8)
|-
|Mrgendratantravrtti, of the Shaiva Siddhanta scholar Narayanakantha
| 6th-10th century CE
|"To have self-mastery is to be a Yogin. The term Yogin means "one who is necessarily "conjoined with" the manifestation of his nature...the Siva-state (sivatvam)" (yp 2a)
|-
|Śaradatilaka of Lakshmanadesikendra, a Shakta Tantra work
| 11th century CE
|"Yogic experts state that yoga is the oneness of the individual Self (jiva) with the atman. Others understand it to be the ascertainment of Siva and the Self as non-different. The scholars of the Agamas say that it is a Knowledge which is of the nature of Siva's Power. Other scholars say it is the knowledge of the primordial Self." (25.1–3b)
|-
|Yogabija, a Hatha yoga work
| 14th century CE
|"The union of apana and prana, one's own rajas and semen, the sun and moon, the individual Self and the supreme Self, and in the same way the union of all dualities, is called yoga. " (89)
|}

Goals
The ultimate goals of yoga are stilling the mind and gaining insight, resting in detached awareness, and liberation (Moksha) from saṃsāra and duḥkha: a process (or discipline) leading to unity (Aikyam) with the divine (Brahman) or with one's Self (Ātman). This goal varies by philosophical or theological system. In the classical Astanga yoga system, the ultimate goal of yoga is to achieve samadhi and remain in that state as pure awareness.

According to Knut A. Jacobsen, yoga has five principal meanings:
 A disciplined method for attaining a goal
 Techniques of controlling the body and mind
 A name of a school or system of philosophy
 With prefixes such as "hatha-, mantra-, and laya-, traditions specialising in particular yoga techniques
 The goal of Yoga practice

David Gordon White writes that yoga's core principles were more or less in place in the 5th century CE, and variations of the principles developed over time:
 A meditative means of discovering dysfunctional perception and cognition, as well as overcoming it to release any suffering, find inner peace, and salvation. Illustration of this principle is found in Hindu texts such as the Bhagavad Gita and Yogasutras, in a number of Buddhist Mahāyāna works, as well as Jain texts.
 The raising and expansion of consciousness from oneself to being coextensive with everyone and everything. These are discussed in sources such as in Hinduism Vedic literature and its epic Mahābhārata, the Jain Praśamaratiprakarana, and Buddhist Nikaya texts.
 A path to omniscience and enlightened consciousness enabling one to comprehend the impermanent (illusive, delusive) and permanent (true, transcendent) reality. Examples of this are found in Hinduism Nyaya and Vaisesika school texts as well as Buddhism Mādhyamaka texts, but in different ways.
 A technique for entering into other bodies, generating multiple bodies, and the attainment of other supernatural accomplishments. These are, states White, described in Tantric literature of Hinduism and Buddhism, as well as the Buddhist Sāmaññaphalasutta. James Mallinson, however, disagrees and suggests that such fringe practices are far removed from the mainstream Yoga's goal as meditation-driven means to liberation in Indian religions.

According to White, the last principle relates to legendary goals of yoga practice; it differs from yoga's practical goals in South Asian thought and practice since the beginning of the Common Era in Hindu, Buddhist, and Jain philosophical schools.

History
There is no consensus on yoga's chronology or origins other than its development in ancient India. There are two broad theories explaining the origins of yoga. The linear model holds that yoga has Vedic origins (as reflected in Vedic texts), and influenced Buddhism. This model is mainly supported by Hindu scholars. According to the synthesis model, yoga is a synthesis of indigenous, non-Vedic practices with Vedic elements. This model is favoured in Western scholarship.

Speculations about yoga began to emerge in the early Upanishads of the first half of the first millennium BCE, with expositions also appearing in Jain and Buddhist texts . Between 200 BCE and 500 CE, traditions of Hindu, Buddhist, and Jain philosophy were taking shape; teachings were collected as sutras, and a philosophical system of Patanjaliyogasastra began to emerge. The Middle Ages saw the development of a number of yoga satellite traditions. It and other aspects of Indian philosophy came to the attention of the educated Western public during the mid-19th century.

Origins

Linear model
According to Edward Fitzpatrick Crangle, Hindu researchers have favoured a linear theory which attempts "to interpret the origin and early development of Indian contemplative practices as a sequential growth from an Aryan genesis"; traditional Hinduism regards the Vedas as the source of all spiritual knowledge. Edwin Bryant wrote that authors who support Indigenous Aryanism also tend to support the linear model.

Synthesis model

Heinrich Zimmer was an exponent of the synthesis model, arguing for non-Vedic eastern states of India. According to Zimmer, Yoga is part of a non-Vedic system which includes the Samkhya school of Hindu philosophy, Jainism and Buddhism: "[Jainism] does not derive from Brahman-Aryan sources, but reflects the cosmology and anthropology of a much older pre-Aryan upper class of northeastern India [Bihar] – being rooted in the same subsoil of archaic metaphysical speculation as Yoga, Sankhya, and Buddhism, the other non-Vedic Indian systems." Richard Gombrich and Geoffrey Samuel believe that the śramaṇa movement originated in non-Vedic Greater Magadha.

Thomas McEvilley favors a composite model in which a pre-Aryan yoga prototype existed in the pre-Vedic period and was refined during the Vedic period. According to Gavin D. Flood, the Upanishads differ fundamentally from the Vedic ritual tradition and indicate non-Vedic influences. However, the traditions may be connected:

The ascetic traditions of the eastern Ganges plain are thought to drew from a common body of practices and philosophies, with proto-samkhya concepts of purusha and prakriti as a common denominator.

Indus Valley Civilisation

The twentieth-century scholars Karel Werner, Thomas McEvilley, and Mircea Eliade believe that the central figure of the Pashupati seal is in a Mulabandhasana posture, and the roots of yoga are in the Indus Valley civilisation. This is rejected by more recent scholarship; for example, Geoffrey Samuel, Andrea R. Jain, and Wendy Doniger describe the identification as speculative; the meaning of the figure will remain unknown until Harappan script is deciphered, and the roots of yoga cannot be linked to the IVC.

Earliest references (1000–500 BCE)

The Vedas, the only texts preserved from the early Vedic period and codified between c. 1200 and 900 BCE, contain references to yogic practices primarily related to ascetics outside, or on the fringes of Brahmanism. The Rigveda Nasadiya Sukta suggests an early Brahmanic contemplative tradition. Techniques for controlling breath and vital energies are mentioned in the Atharvaveda and in the Brahmanas (the second layer of the Vedas, composed c. 1000–800 BCE).

According to Flood, "The Samhitas [the mantras of the Vedas] contain some references ... to ascetics, namely the Munis or Keśins and the Vratyas." Werner wrote in 1977 that the Rigveda does not describe yoga, and there is little evidence of practices. The earliest description of "an outsider who does not belong to the Brahminic establishment" is found in the Keśin hymn 10.136, the Rigveda youngest book, which was codified around 1000 BCE. Werner wrote that there were

According to Whicher (1998), scholarship frequently fails to see the connection between the contemplative practices of the rishis and later yoga practices: "The proto-Yoga of the Vedic rishis is an early form of sacrificial mysticism and contains many elements characteristic of later Yoga that include: concentration, meditative observation, ascetic forms of practice (tapas), breath control practiced in conjunction with the recitation of sacred hymns during the ritual, the notion of self-sacrifice, impeccably accurate recitation of sacred words (prefiguring mantra-yoga), mystical experience, and the engagement with a reality far greater than our psychological identity or the ego." Jacobsen wrote in 2018, "Bodily postures are closely related to the tradition of (tapas), ascetic practices in the Vedic tradition"; ascetic practices used by Vedic priests "in their preparations for the performance of the sacrifice" may be precursors of yoga. "The ecstatic practice of enigmatic longhaired muni in Rgveda 10.136 and the ascetic performance of the vratya-s in the Atharvaveda outside of or on the fringe of the Brahmanical ritual order, have probably contributed more to the ascetic practices of yoga."

According to Bryant, practices recognizable as classical yoga first appear in the Upanishads (composed during the late Vedic period). Alexander Wynne agrees that formless, elemental meditation might have originated in the Upanishadic tradition. An early reference to meditation is made in the Brihadaranyaka Upanishad (c. 900 BCE), one of the Principal Upanishads. The Chandogya Upanishad (c. 800–700 BCE) describes the five vital energies (prana), and concepts of later yoga traditions (such as blood vessels and an internal sound) are also described in this upanishad. The practice of pranayama (focusing on the breath) is mentioned in hymn 1.5.23 of the Brihadaranyaka Upanishad, and pratyahara (withdrawal of the senses) is mentioned in hymn 8.15 of Chandogya Upanishad. The Jaiminiya Upanishad Brahmana (probably before the 6th c. BCE) teaches breath control and repetition of a mantra. The 6th-c. BCE Taittiriya Upanishad defines yoga as the mastery of body and senses. According to Flood, "[T]he actual term yoga first appears in the Katha Upanishad, dated to the fifth to first centuries BCE.

Second urbanisation (500–200 BCE)

Systematic yoga concepts begin to emerge in texts dating to c. 500–200 BCE, such as the early Buddhist texts, the middle Upanishads, and the  Mahabharata Bhagavad Gita and Shanti Parva.

Buddhism and the śramaṇa movement

According to Geoffrey Samuel, the "best evidence to date" suggests that yogic practices "developed in the same ascetic circles as the early śramaṇa movements (Buddhists, Jainas and Ajivikas), probably in around the sixth and fifth centuries BCE." This occurred during India's second urbanisation period. According to Mallinson and Singleton, these traditions were the first to use mind-body techniques (known as Dhyāna and tapas) but later described as yoga, to strive for liberation from the round of rebirth.

Werner writes, "The Buddha was the founder of his [Yoga] system, even though, admittedly, he made use of some of the experiences he had previously gained under various Yoga teachers of his time." He notes:

Early Buddhist texts describe yogic and meditative practices, some of which the Buddha borrowed from the śramaṇa tradition.Barbara Stoler Miller, "Yoga: Discipline of Freedom: the Yoga Sutra Attributed to Patanjali; a Translation of the Text, with Commentary, Introduction, and Glossary of Keywords." University of California Press, 1996, p. 8. The Pāli Canon contains three passages in which the Buddha describes pressing the tongue against the palate to control hunger or the mind, depending on the passage. There is no mention of the tongue inserted into the nasopharynx, as in khecarī mudrā. The Buddha used a posture in which pressure is put on the perineum with the heel, similar to modern postures used to evoke Kundalini. Suttas which discuss yogic practice include the Satipatthana Sutta (the four foundations of mindfulness sutta) and the Anapanasati Sutta (the mindfulness of breathing sutta).

The chronology of these yoga-related early Buddhist texts, like the ancient Hindu texts, is unclear. Early Buddhist sources such as the Majjhima Nikāya mention meditation; the Aṅguttara Nikāya describes jhāyins (meditators) who resemble early Hindu descriptions of muni, the Kesin and meditating ascetics, but the meditation practices are not called "yoga" in these texts. The earliest known discussions of yoga in Buddhist literature, as understood in a modern context, are from the later Buddhist Yogācāra and Theravada schools.

Jain meditation is a yoga system which predated the Buddhist school. Since Jain sources are later than Buddhist ones, however, it is difficult to distinguish between the early Jain school and elements derived from other schools. Most of the other contemporary yoga systems alluded to in the Upanishads and some Buddhist texts have been lost.

Upanishads
The Upanishads, composed in the late Vedic period, contain the first references to practices recognizable as classical yoga. The first known appearance of the word "yoga" in the modern sense is in the Katha Upanishad (probably composed between the fifth and third centuries BCE), where it is defined as steady control of the senses whichwith cessation of mental activityleads to a supreme state. The Katha Upanishad integrates the monism of the early Upanishads with concepts of samkhya and yoga. It defines levels of existence by their proximity to one's innermost being. Yoga is viewed as a process of interiorization, or ascent of consciousness. The upanishad is the earliest literary work which highlights the fundamentals of yoga. According to White,

The hymns in book two of the Shvetashvatara Upanishad (another late-first-millennium BCE text) describe a procedure in which the body is upright, the breath is restrained and the mind is meditatively focused, preferably in a cave or a place that is simple and quiet.

The Maitrayaniya Upanishad, probably composed later than the Katha and Shvetashvatara Upanishads but before the Yoga Sutras of Patanjali, mentions a sixfold yoga method: breath control, introspective withdrawal of the senses, meditation (dhyana), mental concentration, logic and reasoning, and spiritual union. In addition to discussions in the Principal Upanishads, the twenty Yoga Upanishads and related texts (such as Yoga Vasistha, composed between the sixth and 14th centuries CE) discuss yoga methods.

Macedonian texts
Alexander the Great reached India in the 4th century BCE. In addition to his army, he brought Greek academics who wrote memoirs about its geography, people, and customs. One of Alexander's companions was Onesicritus (quoted in Book 15, Sections 63–65 by Strabo in his Geography), who describes yogis. Onesicritus says that the yogis were aloof and adopted "different postures – standing or sitting or lying naked – and motionless".

Onesicritus also mentions attempts by his colleague, Calanus, to meet them. Initially denied an audience, he was later invited because he was sent by a "king curious of wisdom and philosophy". Onesicritus and Calanus learn that the yogis consider life's best doctrines to "rid the spirit of not only pain, but also pleasure", that "man trains the body for toil in order that his opinions may be strengthened", that "there is no shame in life on frugal fare", and that "the best place to inhabit is one with scantiest equipment or outfit". According to Charles Rockwell Lanman, these principles are significant in the history of yoga's spiritual side and may reflect the roots of "undisturbed calmness" and "mindfulness through balance" in the later works of Patanjali and Buddhaghosa.

Mahabharata and Bhagavad GitaNirodhayoga (yoga of cessation), an early form of yoga, is described in the Mokshadharma section of the 12th chapter (Shanti Parva) of the third-century BCE Mahabharata. Nirodhayoga emphasizes progressive withdrawal from empirical consciousness, including thoughts and sensations, until purusha (self) is realized. Terms such as vichara (subtle reflection) and viveka (discrimination) similar to Patanjali's terminology are used, but not described. Although the Mahabharata contains no uniform yogic goal, the separation of self from matter and perception of Brahman everywhere are described as goals of yoga. Samkhya and yoga are conflated, and some verses describe them as identical. Mokshadharma also describes an early practice of elemental meditation. The Mahabharata defines the purpose of yoga as uniting the individual ātman with the universal Brahman pervading all things.

The Bhagavad Gita (Song of the Lord), part of the Mahabharata, contains extensive teachings about yoga. According to Mallinson and Singleton, the Gita "seeks to appropriate yoga from the renunciate milieu in which it originated, teaching that it is compatible with worldly activity carried out according to one's caste and life stage; it is only the fruits of one's actions that are to be renounced." In addition to a chapter (chapter six) dedicated to traditional yoga practice (including meditation), it introduces three significant types of yoga:
 Karma yoga: yoga of action
 Bhakti yoga: yoga of devotion
 Jnana yoga: yoga of knowledgeJack Hawley (2011), The Bhagavad Gita, pages 50, 130; Arvind Sharma (2000), Classical Hindu Thought: An Introduction, Oxford University Press, pages 114–122

The Gita consists of 18 chapters and 700 shlokas (verses); each chapter is named for a different form of yoga. Some scholars divide the Gita into three sections; the first six chapters (280 shlokas) deal with karma yoga, the middle six (209 shlokas) with bhakti yoga, and the last six (211 shlokas with jnana yoga. However, elements of all three are found throughout the work.

Philosophical sutras

Yoga is discussed in the foundational sutras of Hindu philosophy. The Vaiśeṣika Sūtra of the Vaisheshika school of Hinduism, composed between the sixth and second centuries BCE, discusses yoga. According to Johannes Bronkhorst, the Vaiśeṣika Sūtra describes yoga as "a state where the mind resides only in the Self and therefore not in the senses". This is equivalent to pratyahara (withdrawal of the senses). The sutra asserts that yoga leads to an absence of sukha (happiness) and dukkha (suffering), describing meditative steps in the journey towards spiritual liberation.

The Brahma Sutras, the foundation text of the Vedanta school of Hinduism, also discusses yoga.  Estimated as completed in its surviving form between 450 BCE and 200 CE,NV Isaeva (1992), Shankara and Indian Philosophy, State University of New York Press, page 36, ""on the whole, scholars are rather unanimous, considering the most probable date for Brahmasutra sometime between the 2nd-century BCE and the 2nd-century CE" its sutras assert that yoga is a means to attain "subtlety of body". The Nyaya Sutras—the foundation text of the Nyaya school, estimated as composed between the sixth century BCE and the secondcentury CEB. K. Matilal (1986), "Perception. An Essay on Classical Indian Theories of Knowledge", Oxford University Press, p. xiv.—discusses yoga in sutras 4.2.38–50. It includes a discussion of yogic ethics, dhyana (meditation) and samadhi, noting that debate and philosophy are also forms of yoga.SC Vidyabhushana (1913, Translator), The Nyâya Sutras, The Sacred Book of the Hindus, Volume VIII, Bhuvaneshvar Asrama Press, pages 137–139

Classical era (200 BCE – 500 CE)
The Indic traditions of Hinduism, Buddhism and Jainism were taking shape during the period between the Mauryan and the Gupta eras (c. 200 BCE – 500 CE), and systems of yoga began to emerge; a number of texts from these traditions discussed and compiled yoga methods and practices. Key works of the era include the Yoga Sūtras of Patañjali, the Yoga-Yājñavalkya, the Yogācārabhūmi-Śāstra, and the Visuddhimagga. Yoga Sutras of Patanjali 

One of the best-known early expressions of Brahminical yoga thought is the Yoga Sutras of Patanjali (early centuries CE, the original name of which may have been the Pātañjalayogaśāstra-sāṃkhya-pravacana (c. 325–425 CE); some scholars believe that it included the sutras and a commentary. As the name suggests, the metaphysical basis of the text is samkhya; the school is mentioned in Kauṭilya's Arthashastra as one of the three categories of anviksikis (philosophies), with yoga and Cārvāka.Olivelle, Patrick (2013), King, Governance, and Law in Ancient India: Kautilya's Arthasastra, Oxford University Press, see Introduction Yoga and samkhya have some differences; yoga accepted the concept of a personal god, and Samkhya was a rational, non-theistic system of Hindu philosophy. Patanjali's system is sometimes called "Seshvara Samkhya", distinguishing it from Kapila's Nirivara Samkhya. The parallels between yoga and samkhya were so close that Max Müller says, "The two philosophies were in popular parlance distinguished from each other as Samkhya with and Samkhya without a Lord." Karel Werner wrote that the systematization of yoga which began in the middle and early Yoga Upanishads culminated in the Yoga Sutras of Patanjali.

The Yoga Sutras are also influenced by the Sramana traditions of Buddhism and Jainism, and may be a further Brahmanical attempt to adopt yoga from those traditions. Larson noted a number of parallels in ancient samkhya, yoga and Abhidharma Buddhism, particularly from the second century BCE to the first century AD. Patanjali's Yoga Sutras are a synthesis of the three traditions. From Samkhya, they adopt the "reflective discernment" (adhyavasaya) of prakrti and purusa (dualism), their metaphysical rationalism, and their three epistemological methods of obtaining knowledge. Larson says that the Yoga Sutras  pursue an altered state of awareness from Abhidharma Buddhism's nirodhasamadhi; unlike Buddhism's "no self or soul", however, yoga (like Samkhya) believes that each individual has a self. The third concept which the Yoga Sutras synthesize is the ascetic tradition of meditation and introspection.

Patanjali's Yoga Sutras are considered the first compilation of yoga philosophy. The verses of the Yoga Sutras are terse. Many later Indian scholars studied them and published their commentaries, such as the Vyasa Bhashya (c. 350–450 CE). Patanjali defines the word "yoga" in his second sutra, and his terse definition hinges on the meaning of three Sanskrit terms. I. K. Taimni translates it as "Yoga is the inhibition of the modifications of the mind". Swami Vivekananda translates the sutra as "Yoga is restraining the mind-stuff (Citta) from taking various forms (Vrittis)." Edwin Bryant writes that to Patanjali, "Yoga essentially consists of meditative practices culminating in attaining a state of consciousness free from all modes of active or discursive thought, and of eventually attaining a state where consciousness is unaware of any object external to itself, that is, is only aware of its own nature as consciousness unmixed with any other object."

Baba Hari Dass writes that if yoga is understood as nirodha (mental control), its goal is "the unqualified state of niruddha (the perfection of that process)". "Yoga (union) implies duality (as in joining of two things or principles); the result of yoga is the nondual state ... as the union of the lower self and higher Self. The nondual state is characterized by the absence of individuality; it can be described as eternal peace, pure love, Self-realization, or liberation."

Patanjali defined an eight-limbed yoga in Yoga Sutras 2.29:
 Yama (The five abstentions): Ahimsa (Non-violence, non-harming other living beings), Satya (truthfulness, non-falsehood), Asteya (non-stealing), Brahmacharya (celibacy, fidelity to one's partner), and Aparigraha (non-avarice, non-possessiveness).
 Niyama (The five "observances"): Śauca (purity, clearness of mind, speech and body), Santosha (contentment, acceptance of others and of one's circumstances), Tapas (persistent meditation, perseverance, austerity), Svādhyāya (study of self, self-reflection, study of Vedas), and Ishvara-Pranidhana (contemplation of God/Supreme Being/True Self).
 Asana: Literally means "seat", and in Patanjali's Sutras refers to the seated position used for meditation.
 Pranayama ("Breath exercises"): Prāna, breath, "āyāma", to "stretch, extend, restrain, stop".
 Pratyahara ("Abstraction"): Withdrawal of the sense organs from external objects.
 Dharana ("Concentration"): Fixing the attention on a single object.
 Dhyana ("Meditation"): Intense contemplation of the nature of the object of meditation.
 Samadhi ("Liberation"): merging consciousness with the object of meditation.

In Hindu scholasticism since the 12th century, yoga has been one of the six orthodox philosophical schools (darsanas): traditions which accept the Vedas.

 Yoga and Vedanta 
Yoga and Vedanta are the two largest surviving schools of Hindu traditions. Although they share many principles, concepts, and the belief in Self, they differ in degree, style, and  methods; yoga accepts three means to obtain knowledge, and Advaita Vedanta accepts. Yoga disputes Advaita Vedanta's monism. It believes that in the state of moksha, each individual discovers the blissful, liberating sense of himself or herself as an independent identity; Advaita Vedanta teaches that in the state of moksha, each individual discovers the blissful, liberating sense of himself or herself as part of oneness with everything, everyone and the Universal Self. They both hold that the free conscience is transcendent, liberated and self-aware. Advaita Vedanta also encourages the use of Patanjali's yoga practices and the Upanishads for those seeking the supreme good and ultimate freedom.

Yoga Yajnavalkya

The Yoga Yajnavalkya is a classical treatise on yoga, attributed to the Vedic sage Yajnavalkya, in the form of a dialogue between Yajnavalkya and the renowned philosopher Gargi Vachaknavi. The origin of the 12-chapter text has been traced to the second century BCE and the fourth century CE. A number of yoga texts, such as the Hatha Yoga Pradipika, the Yoga Kundalini and the Yoga Tattva Upanishads, have borrowed from (or frequently refer to) the Yoga Yajnavalkya. It discusses eight yoga asanas (Swastika, Gomukha, Padma, Vira, Simha, Bhadra, Mukta and Mayura), a number of breathing exercises for body cleansing, and meditation.

 Abhidharma and Yogachara 

The Buddhist tradition of Abhidharma spawned treatises which expanded teachings on Buddhist theory and yoga techniques which influenced Mahayana and Theravada Buddhism. At the height of the Gupta period (fourth to fifth centuries CE), a northern Mahayana movement known as Yogācāra began to be systematized with the writings of Buddhist scholars Asanga and Vasubandhu. Yogācāra Buddhism provided a systematic framework for practices which lead a bodhisattva towards awakening and full Buddhahood. Its teachings are found in the encyclopedic Yogācārabhūmi-Śāstra (Treatise for Yoga Practitioners), which was also translated into Tibetan and Chinese and influenced East Asian and Tibetan Buddhist traditions. Mallinson and Singleton write that the study of Yogācāra Buddhism is essential to understand yoga's early history, and its teachings influenced the Pātañjalayogaśāstra. The South India and Sri Lankan-based Theravada school also developed manuals for yogic and meditative training, primarily the Vimuttimagga and the Visuddhimagga.

Jainism

According to Tattvarthasutra, a second-to-fifth century Jain text, yoga is the sum of all activities of mind, speech and body. Umasvati calls yoga the generator of karma, and essential to the path to liberation. In his Niyamasara, Kundakunda describes yoga bhakti—devotion to the path to liberation—as the highest form of devotion. Haribhadra and Hemacandra note the five major vows of ascetics and 12 minor vows of laity in yoga. According to Robert J. Zydenbos, Jainism is a system of yogic thinking which became a religion. The five yamas (constraints) of the Yoga Sutras of Patanjali are similar to Jainism's five major vows, indicating cross-fertilization between these traditions. Hinduism's influence on Jain yoga may be seen in Haribhadra's Yogadṛṣṭisamuccaya, which outlines an eightfold yoga influenced by Patanjali's eightfold yoga.

Middle Ages (500–1500 CE)
 
The Middle Ages saw the development of satellite yoga traditions. Hatha yoga emerged during this period.

Bhakti movement

In medieval Hinduism, the Bhakti movement advocated the concept of a personal god or Supreme Personality. The movement, begun by the Alvars of South India during the 6th to 9th centuries, became influential throughout India by the 12th to 15th centuries. Shaiva and Vaishnava bhakti traditions integrated aspects of the Yoga Sutras (such as meditative exercises) with devotion. The Bhagavata Purana elucidates a form of yoga known as viraha (separation) bhakti, which emphasizes concentration on Krishna.

TantraTantra is a range of esoteric traditions which had begun to arise in India by the 5th century CE. Its use suggests that the word tantra in the Rigveda means "technique". George Samuel wrote that tantra is a contested term, but may be considered a school whose practices appeared in nearly-complete form in Buddhist and Hindu texts by about the 10th century CE. Tantric yoga developed complex visualizations, which included meditation on the body as a microcosm of the cosmos. It included mantras, breath control, and body manipulation (including its nadis and chakras. Teachings about chakras and Kundalini became central to later forms of Indian yoga.

Tantric concepts influenced Hindu, Bon, Buddhist, and Jain traditions. Elements of Tantric rituals were adopted by, and influenced, state functions in medieval Buddhist and Hindu kingdoms in East and Southeast Asia. By the turn of the first millennium, hatha yoga emerged from tantra.

Vajrayana and Tibetan Buddhism
Vajrayana is also known as Tantric Buddhism and Tantrayāna. Its texts began to be compiled during the seventh century CE, and Tibetan translations were completed the following century. These tantra texts were the main source of Buddhist knowledge imported into Tibet, and were later translated into Chinese and other Asian languages. The Buddhist text Hevajra Tantra and caryāgiti introduced hierarchies of chakras. Yoga is a significant practice in Tantric Buddhism.Chogyam Trungpa (2001) The Lion's Roar: An Introduction to Tantra. Shambhala. 

Tantra yoga practices include postures and breathing exercises. The Nyingma school practices yantra yoga, a discipline which includes breath work, meditation and other exercises. Nyingma meditation is divided into stages, such as Kriya Yoga, Upa yoga, Yoga yana, mahā yoga, Anu yoga and atiyoga. The Sarma traditions also include Kriya, Upa (called "Charya"), and yoga, with anuttara yoga replacing mahayoga and atiyoga.

Zen Buddhism

Zen, whose name derives from the Sanskrit dhyāna via the Chinese ch'an, is a form of Mahayana Buddhism in which yoga is an integral part.

Medieval hatha yoga

The first references to hatha yoga are in eighth-century Buddhist works. The earliest definition of hatha yoga is in the 11th-century Buddhist text Vimalaprabha. Hatha yoga blends elements of Patanjali's Yoga Sutras with posture and breathing exercises. It marks the development of asanas into the full-body postures in current popular use and, with its modern variations, is the style presently associated with the word "yoga".

Sikhism
Yogic groups became prominent in Punjab during the 15th and 16th centuries, when Sikhism was beginning. Compositions by Guru Nanak (the founder of Sikhism) describe dialogues he had with Jogis, a Hindu community which practiced yoga. Guru Nanak rejected the austerities, rites and rituals associated with hatha yoga, advocating sahaja yoga or nama yoga instead. According to the Guru Granth Sahib,

Modern revival
Introduction in the West

Yoga and other aspects of Indian philosophy came to the attention of the educated Western public during the mid-19th century, and N. C. Paul published his Treatise on Yoga Philosophy in 1851. Swami Vivekananda, the first Hindu teacher to advocate and disseminate elements of yoga to a Western audience, toured Europe and the United States in the 1890s. His reception built on the interest of intellectuals who included the New England Transcendentalists; among them were Ralph Waldo Emerson (1803–1882), who drew on German Romanticism and philosophers and scholars such as Georg Wilhelm Friedrich Hegel (1770–1831), the brothers August Wilhelm Schlegel (1767–1845) and Friedrich Schlegel (1772–1829), Max Mueller (1823–1900), and Arthur Schopenhauer (1788–1860).

Theosophists, including Helena Blavatsky, also influenced the Western public's view of yoga. Esoteric views at the end of the 19th century encouraged the reception of Vedanta and yoga, with their correspondence between the spiritual and the physical. The reception of yoga and Vedanta entwined with the (primarily neoplatonic) currents of religious and philosophical reform and transformation during the 19th and early 20th centuries. Mircea Eliade brought a new element to yoga, emphasizing tantric yoga in his Yoga: Immortality and Freedom. With the introduction of tantra traditions and philosophy, the conception of the "transcendent" attained by yogic practice shifted from the mind to the body.

Yoga as exercise

The postural yoga of the Western world is a physical activity consisting of asanas (often connected by smooth transitions, sometimes accompanied by breathing exercises and usually ending with a period of relaxation or meditation. It is often known simply as "yoga", despite older Hindu traditions (some dating to the Yoga Sutras) in which asanas played little or no part; asanas were not central to any tradition.

Yoga as exercise is part of a modern yoga renaissance, a 20th-century blend of Western gymnastics and haṭha yoga pioneered by Shri Yogendra and Swami Kuvalayananda. Before 1900, hatha yoga had few standing poses; the Sun Salutation was pioneered by Bhawanrao Shrinivasrao Pant Pratinidhi, the Rajah of Aundh, during the 1920s. Many standing poses used in gymnastics were incorporated into yoga by Krishnamacharya in Mysore between the 1930s and the 1950s. Several of his students founded schools of yoga. Pattabhi Jois created ashtanga vinyasa yoga, which led to Power Yoga; B. K. S. Iyengar created Iyengar Yoga and systematised asanas in his 1966 book, Light on Yoga; Indra Devi taught yoga to Hollywood actors; and Krishnamacharya's son, T. K. V. Desikachar, founded the Krishnamacharya Yoga Mandalam in Chennai. Other schools founded during the 20th century include Bikram Choudhury's Bikram Yoga and Swami Sivananda of Rishikesh's Sivananda yoga. Modern yoga has spread around the world.

The number of asanas used in yoga has increased from 84 in 1830 (as illustrated in Joga Pradipika) to about 200 in Light on Yoga and over 900 performed by Dharma Mittra by 1984. The goal of haṭha yoga (spiritual liberation through energy) was largely replaced by the goals of fitness and relaxation, and many of its more esoteric components were reduced or removed. The term "hatha yoga" also refers to gentle yoga, often for women.

Yoga has developed into a worldwide, multi-billion-dollar business involving classes, teacher certification, clothing, books, videos, equipment, and holidays. The ancient, cross-legged lotus position and Siddhasana are widely-recognised symbols of yoga. The United Nations General Assembly established 21 June as the International Day of Yoga, and it has been celebrated annually around the world since 2015. On 1 December 2016, yoga was listed by UNESCO as an intangible cultural heritage.

The effect of postural yoga on physical and mental health has been a subject of study, with evidence that regular yoga practice is beneficial for low back pain and stress. In 2017, a Cochrane review found that yoga interventions designed for chronic low back pain increased function at the six month mark, and modestly decreased pain after 3–4 months. The decrease in pain was found to be similar to other exercise programs designed for low-back pain, but the decrease is not large enough to be deemed clinically significant. Theories of the mechanism underlying these changes include the increase in strength and flexibility, physical and mental relaxation and increased body awareness.

 Traditions 
Yoga is practised with a variety of methods by all Indian religions. In Hinduism, practices include jnana yoga, bhakti yoga, karma yoga, kundalini yoga, and hatha yoga.

 Jain yoga 

Yoga has been a central practice in Jainism. Jain spirituality is based on a strict code of nonviolence, or ahimsa (which includes vegetarianism), almsgiving (dāna), faith in the three jewels, austerities (tapas) such as fasting, and yoga. Jain yoga aims at the liberation and purification of the self from the forces of karma, which binds the self to the cycle of reincarnation. Like yoga and Sankhya, Jainism believes in a number of individual selves bound by their individual karma. Only through the reduction of karmic influences and the exhaustion of collected karma can one become purified and released. Early Jain yoga seems to have been divided into several types, including meditation, abandonment of the body (kāyotsarga), contemplation, and reflection (bhāvanā).

 Buddhist yoga 

Buddhist yoga encompasses a variety of methods which aim to develop the 37 aids to awakening. Its ultimate goal is bodhi (awakening) or nirvana (cessation), traditionally seen as the permanent end of suffering (dukkha) and rebirth. Buddhist texts use a number of terms for spiritual praxis in addition to yoga, such as bhāvanā ("development") and jhāna/dhyāna.

In early Buddhism, yoga practices included:
 the four dhyānas (four meditations or mental absorptions), 
 the four satipatthanas (foundations or establishments of mindfulness), 
 anapanasati (mindfulness of breath), 
 the four immaterial dwellings (supranormal states of mind),
 the brahmavihārās (divine abodes).
 Anussati (contemplations, recollections)

These meditations were seen as supported by the other elements of the Noble Eightfold Path, such as ethics, right exertion, sense restraint and right view. Two mental qualities are said to be indispensable for yoga practice in Buddhism: samatha (calm, stability) and vipassanā (insight, clear seeing). Samatha is a stable, relaxed mind, associated with samadhi (mental unification, focus) and dhyana (a state of meditative absorption). Vipassanā is insight or penetrative understanding into the true nature of phenomena, also defined as "seeing things as they truly are" (yathābhūtaṃ darśanam). A unique feature of classical Buddhism is its understanding of all phenomena (dhammas) as being empty of a self.Paul Williams (2008). Mahayana Buddhism: The Doctrinal Foundations. Routledge. pp. 68–69. .

Later developments in Buddhist traditions led to innovations in yoga practice. The conservative Theravada school developed new ideas on meditation and yoga in its later works, the most influential of which is the Visuddhimagga. Mahayana meditation teachings may be seen in the Yogācārabhūmi-Śāstra, compiled c. 4th century. Mahayana also developed and adopted yoga methods such as the use of mantras and dharani, pure land practices aiming at rebirth in a pure land or buddhafield, and visualization. Chinese Buddhism developed the Chan practice of Koan introspection and Hua Tou. Tantric Buddhism developed and adopted tantric methods which are the basis of the Tibetan Buddhist yoga systems, including deity yoga, guru yoga, the six yogas of Naropa, Kalacakra, Mahamudra and Dzogchen.

 Classical yoga 

What is often referred to as classical yoga, ashtanga yoga, or rāja yoga is primarily the yoga outlined in the dualistic Yoga Sutras of Patanjali. The origins of classical yoga are unclear, although early discussions of the term appear in the Upanishads. Rāja yoga (yoga of kings) originally denoted the ultimate goal of yoga; samadhi, but was popularised by Vivekananda as a common name for ashtanga yoga, the eight limbs attain samadhi as described in the Yoga Sutras. Yoga philosophy came to be regarded as a distinct orthodox school (darsanas) of Hinduism in the second half of the first millennium CE.

Classical yoga incorporates epistemology, metaphysics, ethical practices, systematic exercises and self-development for body, mind and spirit. Its epistemology (pramana) and metaphysics are similar to the Sāṅkhya school. The Classical yoga's metaphysics, like Sāṅkhya's, primarily posits two distinct realities: prakriti (nature, the eternal and active unconscious source of the material world composed of three Gunas) and puruṣa (consciousness), the plural consciousnesses which are the intelligent principles of the world. Moksha (liberation) results from the isolation (kaivalya) of puruṣa from prakirti, and is achieved through meditation, stilling one's thought waves (citta vritti) and resting in pure awareness of puruṣa. Unlike Sāṅkhya, which takes a non-theistic approach, the yoga school of Hinduism accepts a "personal, yet essentially inactive, deity" or "personal god" (Ishvara).

 In Advaita Vedanta 

Vedanta is a varied tradition, with a number of sub-schools and philosophical views. It focuses on the study of the Upanishads and the Brahma Sutras (one of its early texts), about gaining spiritual knowledge of Brahman: the unchanging, absolute reality.

One of the earliest and most influential sub-traditions of Vedanta is Advaita Vedanta, which posits non-dualistic monism. It emphasizes jñāna yoga (yoga of knowledge), which aims at realizing the identity of one's atman (individual consciousness) with Brahman (the Absolute consciousness).Comans, Michael (2000), The Method of Early Advaita Vedānta: A Study of Gauḍapāda, Śaṅkara, Sureśvara, and Padmapāda, Delhi: Motilal Banarsidass, p. 183. The most influential thinker of this school is Adi Shankara (8th century), who wrote commentaries and other works on jñāna yoga. In Advaita Vedanta, jñāna is attained from scripture, one's guru, and through a process of listening to (and meditating on) teachings. Qualities such as discrimination, renunciation, tranquility, temperance, dispassion, endurance, faith, attention, and a longing for knowledge and freedom are also desirable. Yoga in Advaita is a "meditative exercise of withdrawal from the particular and identification with the universal, leading to contemplation of oneself as the most universal, namely, Consciousness".Yoga Vasistha is an influential Advaita text which uses short stories and anecdotes to illustrate its ideas. Teaching seven stages of yoga practice, it was a major reference for medieval Advaita Vedanta yoga scholars and one of the most popular texts on Hindu yoga before the 12th century. Another text which teaches yoga from an Advaita point of view is the Yoga Yajnavalkya. Tantric yoga 

According to Samuel, Tantra is a contested concept. Tantra yoga may be described as practices in 9th to 10th century Buddhist and Hindu (Saiva, Shakti) texts which included yogic practices with elaborate deity visualizations using geometric arrays and drawings (mandalas), male and (particularly) female deities, life-stage-related rituals, the use of chakras and mantras, and sexual techniques aimed at aiding one's health, longevity and liberation.

 Hatha yoga 

Hatha yoga focuses on physical and mental strength-building exercises and postures described primarily in three Hindu texts:See Burley, page 73.
 Hatha Yoga Pradipika by Svātmārāma (15th century)
 Shiva Samhita, author unknown (1500 or late 17th century)
 Gheranda Samhita by Gheranda (late 17th century)

Some scholars include Gorakshanath's 11th-century Goraksha Samhita on the list, since Gorakshanath is considered responsible for popularizing present-day hatha yoga.Bajpai writes on page 524: "Nobody can dispute about the top ranking position of Sage Gorakshanath in the philosophy of Yoga." Vajrayana Buddhism, founded by the Indian Mahasiddhas, has a series of asanas and pranayamas (such as tummo) which resemble hatha yoga.

 Laya and kundalini yoga 
Laya and kundalini yoga, closely associated with hatha yoga, are often presented as independent approaches. According to Georg Feuerstein, laya yoga (yoga of dissolution or merging) "makes meditative absorption (laya) its focus. The laya-yogin seeks to transcend all memory traces and sensory experiences by dissolving the microcosm, the mind, in the transcendental Self-Consciousness." Laya yoga has a number of techniques which include listening to the "inner sound" (nada), mudras such as Khechari and Shambhavi mudra, and awakening kundalini (body energy).

Kundalini yoga aims to awaken bodily and cosmic energy with breath and body techniques, uniting them with universal consciousness. A common teaching method awakens kundalini in the lowest chakra and guides it through the central channel to unite with the absolute consciousness in the highest chakra, at the top of the head.

Reception by other religions
Christianity
Some Christians integrate physical aspects of yoga, stripped from the spiritual roots of Hinduism, and other aspects of Eastern spirituality with prayer, meditation and Jesus-centric affirmations. The practice also includes renaming poses in English (rather than using the original Sanskrit terms), and abandoning involved Hindu mantras as well as the philosophy of Yoga; Yoga is associated and reframed into Christianity. This has drawn charges of cultural appropriation from various Hindu groups; scholars remain skeptical. Previously, the Roman Catholic Church, and some other Christian organizations have expressed concerns and disapproval with respect to some eastern and New Age practices that include yoga and meditation.

In 1989 and 2003, the Vatican issued two documents: Aspects of Christian meditation and "A Christian reflection on the New Age," that were mostly critical of eastern and New Age practices. The 2003 document was published as a 90-page handbook detailing the Vatican's position. The Vatican warned that concentration on the physical aspects of meditation "can degenerate into a cult of the body" and that equating bodily states with mysticism "could also lead to psychic disturbance and, at times, to moral deviations." Such has been compared to the early days of Christianity, when the church opposed the gnostics' belief that salvation came not through faith but through mystical inner knowledge. The letter also says, "one can see if and how [prayer] might be enriched by meditation methods developed in other religions and cultures" but maintains the idea that "there must be some fit between the nature of [other approaches to] prayer and Christian beliefs about ultimate reality." Some fundamentalist Christian organizations consider yoga to be incompatible with their religious background, considering it a part of the New Age movement inconsistent with Christianity.

Islam

Early-11th-century Persian scholar Al-Biruni visited India, lived with Hindus for 16 years, and (with their help) translated several Sanskrit works into Arabic and Persian; one of these was Patanjali's Yoga Sutras. Although Al-Biruni's translation preserved many core themes of Patañjali's yoga philosophy, some sutras and commentaries were restated for consistency with monotheistic Islamic theology.Philipp Maas (2013), A Concise Historiography of Classical Yoga Philosophy, in Periodization and Historiography of Indian Philosophy (Editor: Eli Franco), Sammlung de Nobili, Institut für Südasien-, Tibet- und Buddhismuskunde der Universität Wien, pages 53–90,  Al-Biruni's version of the Yoga Sutras reached Persia and the Arabian Peninsula by about 1050. During the 16th century, the hatha yoga text Amritakunda'' was translated into Arabic and Persian. Yoga was, however, not accepted by mainstream Sunni and Shia Islam. Minority Islamic sects such as the mystic Sufi movement, particularly in South Asia, adopted Indian yoga postures and breath control. Muhammad Ghawth, a 16th-century Shattari Sufi and translator of yoga text, was criticized for his interest in yoga and persecuted for his Sufi beliefs.

Malaysia's top Islamic body imposed a legally-enforceable 2008 fatwa prohibiting Muslims from practicing yoga, saying that it had elements of Hinduism and its practice was haram as blasphemy. Malaysian Muslims who had been practicing yoga for years called the decision "insulting." Sisters in Islam, a Malaysian women's-rights group, expressed disappointment and said that yoga was a form of exercise. Malaysia's prime minister clarified that yoga as exercise is permissible, but the chanting of religious mantras is not.

The Indonesian Ulema Council (MUI) imposed a 2009 fatwa banning yoga because it contains Hindu elements. These fatwas have been criticized by Darul Uloom Deoband, a Deobandi Islamic seminary in India. Similar fatwas banning yoga for its link to Hinduism were imposed by Grand Mufti Ali Gomaa in Egypt in 2004, and by Islamic clerics in Singapore earlier.

According to Iran's yoga association, the country had about 200 yoga centres in May 2014. One-quarter were in the capital, Tehran, where groups could be seen practising in parks; conservatives were opposed. In May 2009, Turkish Directorate of Religious Affairs head Ali Bardakoğlu discounted personal-development techniques such as reiki and yoga as commercial ventures which could lead to extremism. According to Bardakoğlu, reiki and yoga could be a form of proselytizing at the expense of Islam. Nouf Marwaai brought yoga to Saudi Arabia in 2017, contributing to making it legal and recognized despite being allegedly threatened by her community who asserts yoga as "un-Islamic".

See also

 List of asanas
 Modern yoga gurus
 List of yoga schools
 Sun Salutation
 Yoga tourism
 Yogis

Notes

References

Sources
Printed sources
 

 
 
 
 

 
 

 
 
 
 
 

 
 
 
 
 
 
 
 
 
 
 

 
 

 
 
 
 
  Reprint edition; Originally published under the title of "The Six Systems of Indian Philosophy."

 

 
 
 
 
 
 
 
 
 
 
 
 

 
 
 
 
 
 
  Bollingen Series XXVI; Edited by Joseph Cambell.
 
 

Websources

External links

 Yoga media on Commons
 Yoga Wikibooks

 
Āstika
Hindu philosophical concepts
Hindu philosophy
Indian inventions
Intangible Cultural Heritage of Humanity
Meditation
Nondualism
Physical exercise
Spiritual practice
Bodyweight exercises